In medieval literature, the ichneumon or echinemon was the enemy of the dragon. When it sees a dragon, the ichneumon covers itself with mud, and closing its nostrils with its tail, attacks and kills the dragon. The ichneumon was also considered by some to be the enemy of the crocodile and the asp, and attack them in the same way. The name was used for the pharaoh's rat, mongoose, or Egyptian mongoose (Herpestes ichneumon), which attacks snakes; it can also mean otter.

Etymology
Ichneumon (ἰχνεύμων) means "tracker" in Greek. Cockatrice, a name for another mythical beast, derives from calcatrix, a Latin translation of this. The Ichneumon was one of the few who could look at a cockatrice without turning to stone.

Primary sources
 Pliny the Elder [1st century CE] (Natural History, Book 8, 88): "The ichneumon is known for its willingness to fight to the death with the snake. To do this, it first covers itself with several coats of mud, drying each coat in the sun to form a kind of armor. When ready it attacks, turning away from the blows it receives until it sees an opportunity, then with its head held sideways it goes for its enemy's throat. The ichneumon also attacks the crocodile in a similar manner."
Strabo [1st century CE] (Geography, Book 17, edited by H.C. Hamilton, W. Falconer): "The ichneumon [is] most destructive both to crocodiles and asps. The ichneumons destroy not only the eggs of the latter, but the animals themselves. The ichneumons are protected by a covering of mud, in which they roll, and then dry themselves in the sun. They then seize the asps by the head or tail, and dragging them into the river, so kill them. They lie in wait for the crocodiles, when the latter are basking in the sun with their mouths open; they then drop into their jaws, and eating through their intestines and belly, issue out of the dead body."
 Isidore of Seville [7th century CE] (Etymologies, Book 12, 2:37): "That which is produced from the smell of this beast is both healthful and poisonous in food."
 Leonardo da Vinci [16th century CE] (The Notebooks of Leonardo da Vinci edited by Jean Paul Richter): "This animal is the mortal enemy of the asp. It is a native of Egypt and when it sees an asp near its place, it runs at once to the bed or mud of the Nile and with this makes itself muddy all over, then it dries itself in the sun, smears itself again with mud, and thus, drying one after the other, it makes itself three or four coatings like a coat of mail. Then it attacks the asp, and fights well with him, so that, taking its time it catches him in the throat and destroys him."
 Nemesianus, in the introduction to the Cynegetica (a poem about hunting), refers to hunting the Ichneumon on river banks among rushes (line 54). The poem is fragmentary and any longer passage describing such hunt has been lost.
 In 18th-century English poet Christopher Smart's "Jubilate Agno", the poet praises his cat, Jeoffry, "For he killed the Ichneumon-rat very pernicious by land."
 In The Wizard of Zao by Lin Carter 1978, the Wizard. Oolb Votz,  defeats - and destroys - his opponent Plopp the goblin shaman by changing into one.

References

Medieval European legendary creatures
Legendary mammals
Fictional mustelids